Hoki can mean:

Hōki Province, was an old province of Japan, today part of the Tottori Prefecture
Hōki, Tottori, a town in Japan
Hōki, a Japanese era name from 770 through 781
Hoki (fish), another name for blue grenadier, a merluccid hake of the genus Macruronus
Hoki, a Japanese surname

See also
Virginia Tech Hokies